The Palmer Hall is a historic building located on 116 E. San Rafael in Colorado Springs, Colorado. It was added to the National Register of Historic Places on July 3, 1986. It is part of the Colorado College campus. Built in 1904, it was named after William Jackson Palmer.

References

Buildings and structures in Colorado Springs, Colorado
National Register of Historic Places in Colorado Springs, Colorado